Nuur-ud-Din Mosque (English: Mosque of the Light of Religion) in Darmstadt, Germany is run by the Ahmadiyya Muslim Community. The foundation stone was laid in May 2002 and was inaugurated in August 2003 by 5th Caliph of the Messiah, Mirza Masroor Ahmad. The mosque is named after 1st Caliph of the Messiah, Hakeem Noor-ud-Din.

See also

Islam in Germany
List of mosques in Europe
100-Mosques-Plan

References

Ahmadiyya mosques in Germany
Mosques completed in 2003
Buildings and structures in Darmstadt
21st-century mosques